Stefan Terzić (born 17 May 1994) is a Serbian handball player who plays for RK Celje and the Serbia national team.

International honours  
EHF Champions League:  
Winner: 2013

References

1994 births
Living people
People from Arilje
Serbian male handball players
Expatriate handball players
Serbian expatriate sportspeople in Germany
Serbian expatriate sportspeople in Spain
Serbian expatriate sportspeople in Romania
S.L. Benfica handball players